Hazaar Chaurasi Ki Maa is a 1998 Indian feature filmthat deals with the life of a woman who loses her son, a Naxalite, to the violence that is a result of his adopted ideology.

The film is directed produced by Govind Nihalani and is based on Magsaysay and Jnanpith award recipient Mahasweta Devi's Bengali 1974 novel Hajar Churashir Maa. The screenplay is written by Nihalani and the dialogues by Tripurari Sharma. The film stars Jaya Bachchan, Anupam Kher, Milind Gunaji, Seema Biswas, Joy Sengupta and Nandita Das. It marks Jaya Bachchan's return to acting after a gap of 18 years.

In 1998, Hazaar Chaurasi Ki Maa won the National Film Award for Best Feature Film in Hindi.

Plot
Dibyanath Chatterji, his bank-employed wife, Sujata, and youngest son, Brati, live an affluent existence in Calcutta, West Bengal, India, circa early 1970s. Sujata is a quiet, devout Hindu, religious, and compassionate woman, and Brati has finished his school and is now attending college. His parents are proud of him, and keep track of his progress. Then their world is shattered during the early hours, when they are informed by the police that Brati has been killed. Dibyanath and Sujata go to identify Brati's body, mourn, lament inconsolably. They know now that their lives will never be the same again - for by the police they will be called the mother and father of corpse No. 1084. Sujata struggles to understand Brati's passing, meets his friends one by one, learns that Brati had a girlfriend, Nandini Mitra (played by Nandita Das), and that's when she finds out that Brati was part of a rebel group often referred to as "Naxalite", a militant leftist group. As she delves deeper and deeper into Brati's former life, she begins to understand her son's struggle, and decides to continue to further this.

Cast
Jaya Bachchan as Sujata Chatterjee
Anupam Kher as Dibyanath Chatterjee
Joy Sengupta as Brati Chatterjee
Seema Biswas as Somu's mother
Rajesh Tailang as Somu's Father
Nandita Das as Nandini Mitra
Milind Gunaji as Inspector Saroj Pal
Mona Ambegaonkar as Bini
Sandeep Kulkarni as Nitu Paul
Yashpal Sharma as Laltu

References

External links
 

1998 films
Films set in Kolkata
Naxalite–Maoist insurgency
Films about Naxalism
Films based on Indian novels
1990s Hindi-language films
Films directed by Govind Nihalani
Best Hindi Feature Film National Film Award winners
Films based on works by Mahasweta Devi